Ahmed Daher, is a Djiboutian international footballer  who plays as a striker.

Daher was the leading scorer for the Djibouti national football team before being overtaken by Mahdi Houssein Mahabeh in 2019. He debuted against Uganda in 2007 and played in three qualifying matches for the 2010 FIFA World Cup.

References

External links
 

1982 births
Living people
Djiboutian footballers
Djibouti international footballers
Association football forwards
Djiboutian expatriate sportspeople in Albania
Djiboutian expatriate sportspeople in Jordan
Expatriate footballers in Jordan
Expatriate footballers in Albania